Heinrich "Heini" Isaacks (born 5 March 1985) is a Namibian footballer who plays for Maritzburg United in the South African Premier Soccer League as a midfielder and striker. He played for Namibia internationals at the 2014 FIFA World Cup qualifiers.

He previously played for Civics FC and SønderjyskE.

International career

International goals
Scores and results list Namibia's goal tally first.

References 

1985 births
Living people
Association football forwards
Association football midfielders
Namibian men's footballers
Namibian expatriate footballers
Namibia international footballers
Maritzburg United F.C. players
F.C. Civics Windhoek players
SønderjyskE Fodbold players
Expatriate soccer players in South Africa
Expatriate men's footballers in Denmark
Namibian expatriate sportspeople in South Africa
Namibian expatriate sportspeople in Denmark